The Vanyume or Desert Serrano are an Indigenous people of Southern California. Traditional Vanyume territory extended along the Mojave River from the Eastern Mojave Desert to present day Victorville and may have included portions of southern Antelope Valley. The major village of Wá’peat was part of this area.

Though the Vanyume were closely related to the neighboring Serrano people linguistically and culturally, the two groups were politically distinct prior to European contact. Because all documented Vanyume villages had been abandoned prior to the development of modern ethnographic fieldwork, ethnographic information on the Vanyume is limited.

Name 
The first European to mention the Vanyume, Father Francisco Garcés, referred to the group using the Mohave exonym Beñemé. Vanyumé, a variation of the term, was later adopted by ethnographer Alfred Louis Kroeber.

Pre-Contact

Population 
A. L. Kroeber described the Vanyume population as "very small" at the time of European contact. A 2017 analysis found that the group could have comprised as many as 700 people at the time of contact.

Language 
The Vanyume traditionally spoke the Vanyume language, a now-extinct Uto-Aztecan language belonging to the Takic branch. The Vanyume language was likely very closely related to the Serrano language, though it may have shared features with the neighboring Kitanemuk language.

Population decline 
Between the late 18th and early 20th centuries, the Vanyume population dramatically declined.

Missionization 
Beginning in 1790, a number of Vanyume people were baptized at Mission San Fernando and Mission San Gabriel. The period between 1811 and 1814 saw the most rapid missionization, a process likely aided through military intimidation. A 1811 effort may have attempted to forcefully round up and relocate the Vanyume and Serrano.

Compared to their upriver counterparts, Vanyume villages on the lower Mojave river enjoyed relative freedom from Spanish influence and missionization.

In late 1810s, a number of Vanyume settlements were depopulated and their residents killed by warring Spanish and Mohave people.

Other factors 
Indigenous Californians interviewed by ethnographers in the late 19th and early 20th centuries describe incidents of trade-related violence with the Mohave as a key factor in the decline and dispersion of Vanyume populations. These conflicts likely occurred around the 1830s.

A number of living individuals are of Vanyume ancestry.

References 

Indigenous peoples of California
Native American tribes in California
California Mission Indians
History of the Mojave Desert region